Shi-Yeon Sung (born 1975, in Busan) is a South Korean classical conductor. In 2006, she became the first woman to win first prize in the Sir Georg Solti International Conductors' Competition. In 2007, she won second prize in Bamberg's Gustav Mahler Conducting Competition (no first prize was given that year). That year, she became the first female assistant conductor of the Boston Symphony Orchestra, a post she held through 2010. Among the orchestras she has conducted are the Los Angeles Philharmonic, Royal Stockholm Philharmonic Orchestra, Swedish Radio Symphony Orchestra and the US National Symphony Orchestra. She was the associate conductor of the Seoul Philharmonic from 2009 to 2013. She has served as the artistic director and chief conductor of Gyeonggi Philharmonic Orchestra since January 2014. in 2022, she was appointed to the role of Principal Guest Conductor of the Auckland Philharmonia Orchestra.

References

Women conductors (music)
South Korean conductors (music)
Living people
1975 births
21st-century conductors (music)